Oh No! It's Johnny! was a Philippine weekly late night talk show aired on ABS-CBN from October 7, 1987, to August 15, 1999. It is hosted by Johnny Litton. The TV show was co-produced by Silverstar Communications, Inc.

In August 2020, the series returned as a web talk show.

History
Johnny Litton, a seasoned television personality, has been in the small tube since the 1970s.

Oh No! It's Johnny premiered on ABS-CBN on October 7, 1987, and was hosted by Johnny Litton. It originally aired every Wednesday night. The show was produced by Roselle Rebano of Silverstar Communications, Inc. and was similar in feel and format to American late night talk shows.

In 1992, Maurice Arcache joined the show as co-host. He popularized his "Arcachat" segment, which gave social and etiquette tips weekly.

In 1995, Oh No! It's Johnny was moved to Friday night and then Sunday night in 1997.

The show ended in August 15, 1999, after 12 years of airing. As a result, it was occupied by The Weekend News on its sunday night timeslot.

OhNLINE It's JOHNNY!
On June 25, 2020, Johnny Litton announced on Facebook that the show will return online as a response to the COVID-19 pandemic. The show is set to air in August 2020.

Hosts

Main host
Johnny Litton

Co-hosts
Maurice Arcache (1992–1999)

See also
List of shows previously aired by ABS-CBN

References

Philippine television talk shows
1987 Philippine television series debuts
1999 Philippine television series endings
ABS-CBN original programming
English-language television shows